Tibor Poór (born 19 November 1914; date of death unknown) was a Hungarian canoeist who competed in the late 1930s. He finished 12th in the folding K-2 10000 m event at the 1936 Summer Olympics in Berlin.

References
Tibor Poór's profile at Sports Reference.com

1914 births
Canoeists at the 1936 Summer Olympics
Hungarian male canoeists
Olympic canoeists of Hungary
Year of death missing
20th-century Hungarian people